Parafaujasia is a genus of flowering plants in the daisy family, native to certain islands in the Indian Ocean.

 Species
 Parafaujasia fontinalis (Cordem.) C.Jeffrey - Réunion 
 Parafaujasia mauritiana C.Jeffrey -  Mauritius

References

Asteraceae genera
Senecioneae
Biota of the Indian Ocean